Thompson Crossroads is an unincorporated community in Hardin County, Tennessee. It is located 11 miles northeast of Savannah and 18 miles north of the Alabama border.

References

Unincorporated communities in Hardin County, Tennessee
Unincorporated communities in Tennessee